The D-Motor LF26 is a lightweight liquid cooled side-valve four-stroke flat four, 2.7 litre petrol aircraft engine, produced by D-Motor in Deerlijk, Belgium.

Design and development
This direct-drive aero-engine is unusual in two respects: it is very oversquare with a bore:stroke ratio of 1.295:1, and it has a side-valve (flathead) valvetrain. The designer determined that since maximum continuous power output (65.3 kW) was to be developed at only 2800 rpm, the extra weight and complexity of overhead valves (OHV) would be superfluous. The engine has port injection, a dry sump lubrication system, and dual ignition.

Variants

Applications
BOT SC07 Speed Cruiser
Foxcon Terrier 200
Niki Lightning
Peak Aerospace Me 109R
Raj Hamsa X-Air
Slepcev Storch
Sherwood Ranger

Specifications
Reference: D-Motor

See also

References

External links
 

Boxer engines
2000s aircraft piston engines
D-Motor aircraft engines